Southern Ireland, South Ireland or South of Ireland may refer to:

The southern part of the island of Ireland
Southern Ireland (1921–22), a former constituent part of the United Kingdom
Republic of Ireland, which is sometimes referred to as "Southern Ireland"
South (European Parliament constituency)
Southern, IE05, one of the level 2 NUTS statistical regions of Ireland

See also 
Munster, the southernmost province of Ireland
South-East Region, Ireland
South-West Region, Ireland